Mstyora is a rural locality (a station) in Vyaznikovsky District of Vladimir Oblast, Russia,  south of an urban locality of the same name (Mstyora).  Municipally, it is a part of Mstyora Urban Settlement, of which the other Mstyora is the administrative center.

Mstyora railway station is in this rural locality.

See also
 Mstyora miniature

Rural localities in Vyaznikovsky District